Glenn Cunningham may refer to:

Glenn Cunningham (athlete) (1909–1988), American runner, Olympic Games medalist
Glenn Cunningham (Nebraska politician) (1912–2003), American politician, mayor of Omaha, and congressman for Nebraska
Glenn Cunningham (New Jersey politician) (1943–2004), American politician, mayor of Jersey City
Glenn Cunningham (speedway rider) (born 1975), British speedway rider, finalist of 1994 Individual U-21 World Championship

See also
Glenn Cunningham Lake, named after Glenn Cunningham, Nebraska politician